Stephen Andrew Higginson (born April 12, 1961) is a United States circuit judge of the United States Court of Appeals for the Fifth Circuit and a Judge of the United States Foreign Intelligence Surveillance Court of Review.

Early life and education
Born in Boston, Higginson graduated from the Groton School in Groton, Massachusetts in 1979. He then attended Harvard University and graduated summa cum laude from Harvard College with an Artium Baccalaureus degree in 1983, where he concentrated in Government and English. After earning a Master of Philosophy from the University of Cambridge the following year, he enrolled in Yale Law School, where from he graduated with a Juris Doctor in 1987. During his time at Yale, he served as Editor-in-Chief of the Yale Law Journal.

From 1987 until 1988, Higginson served as a law clerk for Judge Patricia Wald of the United States Court of Appeals for the District of Columbia Circuit. He then served as a law clerk for Justice Byron White on the United States Supreme Court from 1988 until 1989.

Professional career
Higginson became an Assistant United States Attorney in 1989, working in the criminal division for the District of Massachusetts. In 1993, he shifted to working in the Eastern District of Louisiana, and he became chief of appeals in 1995. From 2004 to 2011, he worked part-time as a prosecutor, continuing to supervise the appellate section. In 2004, he became a full-time faculty member at Loyola University New Orleans College of Law. He taught criminal procedure, constitutional law and evidence. Higginson is an elected member of the American Law Institute.

Federal judicial service
On May 5, 2011, President Barack Obama announced his intent to nominate Higginson to a seat on the United States Court of Appeals for the Fifth Circuit and submitted the nomination to the Senate on May 9, 2011. He filled the seat that was vacated by Judge Jacques L. Wiener Jr., who assumed senior status in 2010.
Senator Mary Landrieu had recommended Higginson to Obama for the vacancy in November 2010. The Senate confirmed Higginson's nomination by a 88–0 vote on October 31, 2011. He received his commission on November 2, 2011. 

On February 25, 2021, Higginson was appointed to the United States Foreign Intelligence Surveillance Court of Review by Chief Justice John Roberts.

Notable cases

In June 2017, Higginson authored the majority opinion in Plummer v. University of Houston, in which the Fifth Circuit affirmed a lower court ruling  that a university did not violate the Due Process Clause or Title IX when it expelled a student for committing a campus sexual assault, as well as his girlfriend, who had recorded the assault and shared the video on social media.

On April 26, 2022, Higginson dissented when the 5th Circuit officially rejected challenges to Texas SB 8, a law that bans abortions within the state after a fetal heartbeat is detected (roughly 6 weeks after a pregnancy) and allows private individuals, or "bounty hunters", to sue anyone who performed or helped a woman get an abortion after the 6 week time frame.

Personal
Higginson is married to Collette Creppell, who is the university architect for Brown University and was the former director of the New Orleans City Planning Commission and the former university architect and director of campus planning for Tulane University. The couple has three children and lives in New Orleans.

See also 
 List of law clerks of the Supreme Court of the United States (Seat 6)

References

External links

1961 births
Living people
21st-century American judges
Alumni of the University of Cambridge
Assistant United States Attorneys
Groton School alumni
Harvard College alumni
Judges of the United States Court of Appeals for the Fifth Circuit
Judges of the United States Foreign Intelligence Surveillance Court of Review
Law clerks of the Supreme Court of the United States
Loyola University New Orleans faculty
United States court of appeals judges appointed by Barack Obama
Yale Law School alumni